Lockerley Camp is the site of an Iron Age univallate hillfort located in Hampshire. Situated on a low gravel-capped plateau, it covers approximately 5 acres and is now much reduced by ploughing, for the majority of the site falls into farmland, although a small area to the north is within a small coppice and the earthworks are more discernible here.

Location
Immediately to the north lies the River Dun. The site lies at a level of approximately 40m AOD.

References



Iron Age sites in England
Buildings and structures in Hampshire
Hill forts in Hampshire
Archaeological sites in Hampshire